Félix Van Campenhout (born 7 December 1910, date of death unknown) was a Belgian footballer. He played in two matches for the Belgium national football team in 1931.

References

External links
 

1910 births
Year of death missing
Belgian footballers
Belgium international footballers
Place of birth missing
Association footballers not categorized by position